On 23 February 2018, at least 45 people were killed and 36 others injured in two car bombings and a shooting in Mogadishu. Al-Shabaab later claimed responsibility.

Attack 
On 23 February 2018, two suicide car bombs exploded in the Somali capital of Mogadishu. The first car bomb went off after militants breached a checkpoint near the president's residence by shooting at security personnel. The other detonated in front of a hotel away from the palace. 45 bystanders were killed and 36 others injured. Five attackers were also reported dead.

Responsibility 
The Somalia-based Islamist group Al-Shabaab claimed responsibility for the attack via its Andalus radio arm, stating that both its drivers were suicide bombers.

References 

2010s in Mogadishu
2018 in Somalia
2018 murders in Somalia
2018 road incidents
February 2018 attacks
2010s road incidents in Africa
21st-century mass murder in Somalia
February 2018 attacks
Attacks on buildings and structures in 2018
February 2018 attacks
Attacks on government buildings and structures
Attacks on hotels in Africa
February 2018 crimes in Africa
Islamic terrorist incidents in 2018
Mass murder in 2018
February 2018 attacks
Road incidents in Somalia
Suicide bombings in 2018
February 2018 attacks
Suicide car and truck bombings in Somalia
Terrorist incidents in Somalia in 2018
Somali Civil War (2009–present)
Building bombings in Somalia
Hotel bombings 
2018 disasters in Somalia